Stinger is a side-scrolling shooter game released by Seibu Denshi for arcades in 1983. It was the first game released by this company. Despite the horizontal scrolling, the game has a vertically oriented screen.

Gameplay

The game consists of traveling  around a space fortress meanwhile shooting aliens and spaceships. An object called "Bongo" could be used as a defense method. This object will shoot itself to the enemies for a few seconds.

Reception 
In Japan, Game Machine listed Stinger on their November 1, 1983 issue as being the sixth most-successful new table arcade unit of the month.

References

External links
 
 Stinger at coinop.org
 Walkthrough and strategy guide at GameFAQs

1983 video games
Arcade video games
Arcade-only video games
Horizontally scrolling shooters
Seibu Denshi games
Video games developed in Japan